Os Turnforening is a multi-sports club from Os, Hordaland, Norway. It has sections for association football, team handball, gymnastics and track and field.

General history
The club was founded in 1905. The football section is semi-independent and counts 1919 as its founding year.

Football
The men's football team the club has played once, the 1975 season, in the top tier of Norwegian football, then known as the 1. divisjon. The team plays at Kuventræ Stadion and in the 3. divisjon. It last played in the 2. divisjon in 2010. The club's manager is the retired defender of the Hungarian national team, Zsolt Korcsmár .

References

External links
 Official site
 Official site, football

Football clubs in Norway
Os, Hordaland
Sports clubs established in 1905
Eliteserien clubs
Association football clubs established in 1919
1905 establishments in Norway
Athletics clubs in Norway